Lake Orestiada or Lake of Kastoria is a lake in the Kastoria regional unit of Macedonia, northwestern Greece. Sitting at an altitude of 630 metres, the lake covers an area of 28 square kilometres.

Nine rivulets flow into the lake, and it drains into the Haliacmon river. Its depth varies from nine to ten metres. The Orestida was formed about 10 million years ago. The Kastoria Peninsula (with the town of Kastoria) divides the lake into two parts, the larger to the north and the smaller to the south.

The lake takes its name from the Oreiades. Lakeside attractions include, apart from the Byzantine architectural heritage of the town, an 11th-century Byzantine monastery of Panagia Mavriotissa and the reconstructed prehistoric settlement of Dispilio, where the Dispilio Tablet was retrieved from the lake in 1992. The lake is known to freeze in winters.

Pictures

See also
Battle of Lake Kastoria (1941)
Krepeni
Mavrochori
Monastery of Panagia Mavriotissa

Bibliography
 1830 Map

Orestiada
Landforms of Kastoria (regional unit)
Kastoria
Landforms of Western Macedonia